Senator Golden may refer to:

Marty Golden (born 1950), New York State Senate
Tim Golden (politician) (fl. 1990s–2010s), Georgia State Senate
William B. Golden (born 1948), Massachusetts State Senate

See also
Gayle Goldin (fl. 2010s), Rhode Island State Senate
Harrison J. Goldin (born 1936), New York State Senate
William Henry Golding (1878–1961), Senate of Canada